The canton of Lunéville-2 is an administrative division of the Meurthe-et-Moselle department, northeastern France. It was created at the French canton reorganisation which came into effect in March 2015. Its seat is in Lunéville.

It consists of the following communes:

Barbonville
Bayon
Blainville-sur-l'Eau
Borville
Brémoncourt
Chanteheux
Charmois
Clayeures
Damelevières
Domptail-en-l'Air
Einvaux
Essey-la-Côte
Ferrières
Fraimbois
Franconville
Froville
Gerbéviller
Giriviller
Haigneville
Haudonville
Haussonville
Hériménil
Lamath
Landécourt
Lorey
Loromontzey
Lunéville (partly)
Magnières
Mattexey
Méhoncourt
Moncel-lès-Lunéville
Mont-sur-Meurthe
Moriviller
Moyen
Rehainviller
Remenoville
Romain
Rosières-aux-Salines
Rozelieures
Saffais
Saint-Boingt
Saint-Germain
Saint-Mard
Saint-Rémy-aux-Bois
Seranville
Tonnoy
Vallois
Vathiménil
Velle-sur-Moselle
Vennezey
Vigneulles
Villacourt
Virecourt
Xermaménil

References

Cantons of Meurthe-et-Moselle